The China men's national tennis team represents the People's Republic of China in Davis Cup tennis competition and are governed by the Chinese Tennis Association. It was represented by the Republic of China from 1924-1946. The team did not participate between 1946-1983, and in 1983 the People's Republic of China competed for the first time.

China currently competes in the Asia/Oceania Zone of Group I.  They have never competed in the World Group, but reached the Play-offs in 1990 and also reached the Eastern Zone final in 1987.

Current team (2022) 

 Zhang Zhizhen
 Wu Yibing
 Bu Yunchaokete
 Li Hanwen
 Te Rigele

History
China competed in its first Davis Cup in 1924.

See also
Davis Cup
China Fed Cup team
Tennis in China

External links

Davis Cup teams
Tennis, Davis Cup
Davis Cup